The Blackberry River is a westward-flowing river located entirely in the far northwest corner of the U.S. state of Connecticut. The river runs for  through the towns of Norfolk and North Canaan, where it empties into the Housatonic River. The river provided waterpower for industrial purposes from the early 1700s through the first part of the 20th century.

Watershed

Historic sights
The river passes the historic Moseley House-Farm, a colonial mansion dating from 1763 in Norfolk, and the Beckley Furnace Industrial Monument in North Canaan.

References

Rivers of Connecticut
Rivers of Litchfield County, Connecticut
Norfolk, Connecticut
North Canaan, Connecticut